Howard Mutchler (February 12, 1859 – January 4, 1916) was a Democratic member of the U.S. House of Representatives from Pennsylvania.

Howard Mutchler (son of William Mutchler), was born in Easton, Pennsylvania.  He attended the public schools of Easton and Phillips Academy in Andover, Massachusetts.  He studied law with his father, but before qualifying for admission to the bar he decided on a newspaper career, and became editor and publisher of the Easton Daily Express and the Northampton Democrat.  He was also active in several businesses, including serving as president of the Easton Telephone Company and the United States Long Distance Telephone Company, and a member of the board of directors of the Easton and Nazareth Transit Company.

His wife was a native of Easton. She was educated at St. Mary's Hall in Burlington, New Jersey; they first met in Easton.

Mutchler was elected as a Democrat to the Fifty-third Congress to fill the vacancy caused by the death of his father, William Mutchler.  He served from August 7, 1893 to March 3, 1895, and was not a candidate for reelection in 1894.

He was elected to the Fifty-seventh Congress in 1900, and served from March 4, 1901 to March 3, 1903. He resumed his newspaper activities, and died in Easton in 1916. He was interred in Easton Cemetery.

Sources

Howard Mutchler at The Political Graveyard

1859 births
1916 deaths
Phillips Academy alumni
Politicians from Easton, Pennsylvania
American newspaper editors
Democratic Party members of the United States House of Representatives from Pennsylvania
19th-century American politicians
Journalists from Pennsylvania